James Ronald Grant (August 4, 1894 – November 30, 1985) was a pitcher in Major League Baseball who played briefly for the Philadelphia Phillies during the  season. He was born in Coalville, Iowa.

Grant, who played most of his career in the minor leagues, pitched from 1916 to 1923 for the Des Moines Boosters and Sioux City Packers of the defunct Western League before joining the Phillies. In two relief appearances for Philadelphia, Grant posted a 13.50 earned run average in 4.0 innings of work, giving up eight runs (two unearned) on 10 hits and four walks. He did not get a decision and was not credited with a save or a strikeout.

Following his majors stint, Grant pitched for the Waterloo Hawks (1926–1928) and Shreveport Sports (1930), before returning to Des Moines (now the Demons) for three and a half seasons (1930–1933). He collected a 106–61 record in ten minor league seasons.

Grant died in Des Moines, Iowa, at the age of 91.

See also
1923 Philadelphia Phillies season

Sources

Retrosheet

Philadelphia Phillies players
Major League Baseball pitchers
Baseball players from Iowa
Des Moines Boosters players
Des Moines Demons players
Shreveport Sports players
Sioux City Packers players
Waterloo Hawks (baseball) players
1894 births
1985 deaths